Colonel John Robert Jermain Macnamara (11 October 1905 – 22 December 1944) was a British Conservative Party politician and officer of the British Army who was killed while fighting in Italy during the Second World War. He was the last sitting MP to die in combat.

Politics
Macnamara was educated at Haileybury where he was a member of the Officer Training Corps. He was the unsuccessful Conservative candidate at the May 1934 by-election in the Upton constituency in West Ham, and at the 1935 general election was elected as Member of Parliament (MP) for Chelmsford. He was also joint secretary, with the Liberal MP Wilfrid Roberts, of the Basque Children's Committee.

Macnamara's personal assistant in 1935–36 was Guy Burgess, later exposed as a Soviet spy. Macnamara was a member of the Anglo-German Fellowship, some of whose members were pro-Nazi. Burgess gained the confidence of Macnamara and they organized a series of sex tours abroad, especially to Germany where Macnamara had ties with the Hitler Youth. Burgess managed to gain contacts with highly placed homosexuals, like Edouard Pfeiffer, the chief private secretary of Édouard Daladier, French War Minister, an agent of the 2nd Office and of MI6. Macnamara and Burgess were invited on several occasions to pleasure parties at Pfeiffer's or to Parisian nightclubs.

Military career
On 11 January 1924, he joined the Territorial Army (TA), the part-time reserve element of the British Army, and was commissioned as a second lieutenant in the 3rd (City of London) Battalion, London Regiment (Royal Fusiliers). His service number was 28393.

During the Second World War, he commanded the 1st Battalion, London Irish Rifles, another TA battalion, which was affiliated to the Royal Ulster Rifles. He was subsequently promoted to the rank of colonel. The battalion was initially assigned to the 168th (London) Infantry Brigade, part of the 56th (London) Infantry Division, nicknamed "The Black Cats", and fought in the Italian theatre of war. In December 1944, Colonel Macnamara was visiting Italy and was with the 1st London Irish who were moving into the Senio Line to relieve a Gurkha battalion. He was watching men of the battalion move up to the line in company with Major M. V. S. Boswell when a sudden German mortar bombardment fell on the area. Macnamara and Lieutenant J. Prosser MC were killed while Major Boswell was wounded. Colonel Macnamara was laid to rest in Forlì War Cemetery.

References

External links

1905 births
1944 deaths
People from Essex
Royal Fusiliers officers
British Army personnel killed in World War II
Conservative Party (UK) MPs for English constituencies
Gay politicians
London Regiment officers
UK MPs 1935–1945
People educated at Haileybury and Imperial Service College
English LGBT politicians
LGBT members of the Parliament of the United Kingdom
LGBT military personnel
20th-century LGBT people